Paint My Love – Greatest Hits is the first greatest hits album by the Danish soft rock band Michael Learns to Rock. It was released in October 1996 by Medley Records in Asia and South Africa. As of May 1999, the album had sold 3.4 million copies worldwide.

The title song, "Paint My Love", is an English version of "Kun med dig" by Danish singers Dorthe Andersen and Martin Loft, which was composed by Jascha Richter. The song won the Danish national selection for the Eurovision Song Contest 1996, but was one of seven entries voted off in a pre-contest semifinal, which was not televised. "Paint My Love", along with the other new song "Breaking My Heart", was later included on the band's fourth studio album, Nothing to Lose (1997).

Track listing

Charts

Certifications and sales

References

1996 greatest hits albums
Michael Learns to Rock albums
Albums produced by Steve Barri